Hydrogen phosphate or Monohydrogen phosphate (systematic name) is the inorganic ion with the formula [HPO4]2-. Its formula can also be written as [PO3(OH)]2-.  Together with dihydrogen phosphate, hydrogenphosphate occurs widely in natural systems.  Their salts are used in fertilizers and in cooking.  Most hydrogenphosphate salts are colorless, water soluble, and nontoxic.

It is a conjugate acid of phosphate [PO4]3- and a conjugate base of dihydrogen phosphate [H2PO4]-.

It is formed when a pyrophosphate anion  reacts with water  by hydrolysis, which can give hydrogenphosphate:
 + H2O  2

Acid-base equilibria
Hydrogenphosphate is an intermediate in the multistep conversion of phosphoric acid to phosphate:

Examples
Diammonium phosphate, (NH4)2HPO4
Disodium phosphate, Na2HPO4, with varying amounts of water of hydration

References

Ions
Phosphates